Year of the Fish is a 2007 American animated film based on Ye Xian, a ninth-century Chinese variant of the fairy tale Cinderella, starring Tsai Chin, Randall Duk Kim, Ken Leung and An Nguyen. Written and directed by David Kaplan, the film is set in a massage parlor in modern-day New York's Chinatown.

The film was executive produced by Janet Yang and produced by Rocco Caruso. Kaplan's screenplay was developed at the Sundance Screenwriters and Directors Labs and was the recipient of a 2005 Leonore Annenberg Fellowship. Year of the Fish had its world premiere at the 2007 Sundance Film Festival.

The film was shot entirely on location in New York City's Chinatown using live actors and then animated in post-production via rotoscoping, the process of tracing over live-action footage to create an animation; in this case, a painterly, watercolor effect. Some of the make-up on the strange-looking characters were removed by the rotoscoping.

Reception
Year of the Fish premiered as the Official Selection of the 2007 Sundance Film Festival and was named "Best Film" at the 2007 Avignon Film Festival. It was also named "Best Film" at the 2007 Asheville Film Festival, won the Audience Award at the 2007 Independent Film Festival of Boston, and was nominated for the Piaget Producers Award at the 2009 Independent Spirit Awards.

References

External links
 (web archive)
 
 David Kaplan Films
 

2007 films
2007 animated films
2000s American animated films
American fantasy films
Films about Chinese Americans
2007 computer-animated films
Films based on Cinderella
Films based on fairy tales
Films based on Chinese myths and legends
American independent films
Films scored by Paul Cantelon
2007 fantasy films
2000s English-language films